The rufous-browed flycatcher (Anthipes solitaris) is a species of bird in the family Muscicapidae.  It is native to Indonesia, Laos, Malaysia, Myanmar, Thailand and Vietnam. Its natural habitat is subtropical or tropical moist montane forests. It was formerly placed in the genus Ficedula.

References

rufous-browed flycatcher
Birds of Southeast Asia
Birds of Thailand
Birds of Vietnam
Birds of the Malay Peninsula
Birds of Sumatra
rufous-browed flycatcher
Taxonomy articles created by Polbot